Coleophora apythana is a moth of the family Coleophoridae. It is found in the lower Volga area of southern Russia.

The larvae feed on Atriplex verrucifera.

References

apythana
Moths described in 1989
Moths of Europe